Canal del Deporte Olímpico or CDO is a privately owned sports pay TV channel of Chile. Is the channel of the Chilean Olympic Committee.

See also
 List of Chilean television channels

External links
  

Television networks in Chile
CDO
Television channels and stations established in 2011
Spanish-language television stations
Companies based in Santiago
Sports television networks